The 2013 UEFA European Under-17 Football Championship qualifying round was the first round of qualifications for the 2013 UEFA European Under-17 Football Championship, which was held in Slovakia.

As the host nation, Slovakia qualified automatically for the tournament. The remaining 52 UEFA members were divided into 13 groups of four teams, with each group being contested as a mini-tournament, hosted by one of the group's teams. After all matches have been played, the 13 group winners, 13 group runners-up and the two best third-placed teams advanced to the elite round. The draw for the qualifying round was held on 29 November 2011 in Nyon, with matches set to take place in autumn 2012.

Seeding
{| class="wikitable"
|-
! width=170|Pot A
! width=170|Pot B
|-
| 
|

Tiebreakers
If two or more teams are equal on points on completion of the group matches, the following criteria are applied to determine the rankings.
 Higher number of points obtained in the group matches played among the teams in question
 Superior goal difference from the group matches played among the teams in question
 Higher number of goals scored in the group matches played among the teams in question
 If, after applying criteria 1) to 3) to several teams, two teams still have an equal ranking, the criteria 1) to 3) will be reapplied to determine the ranking of these teams. If this procedure does not lead to a decision, criteria 5) and 6) will apply
 Results of all group matches:
 Superior goal difference
 Higher number of goals scored
 Drawing of lots
Additionally, if two teams which have the same number of points and the same number of goals scored and conceded play their last group match against each other and are still equal at the end of that match, their final rankings are determined by the penalty shoot-out and not by the criteria listed above. This procedure is applicable only if a ranking of the teams is required to determine the group winner or the runners-up and the third-placed team.

Group 1

Group 2

Group 3

Group 4
The three-way tie-breaker left Spain on third place, and Poland ranked first.

Group 5

Group 6

Group 7

* On 26 October 2012, the match between Wales and Estonia played at Sportland Arena in Tallinn was abandoned after twenty-six minutes due to heavy snow. Wales were leading 1–0. The remaining 54 minutes were replayed on 14 November 2012 in Tallinn with exactly the same team selection as in the original match.

Group 8

Group 9

Group 10

Group 11

Group 12

Group 13

Ranking of third-placed teams
To determine the two best third-ranked teams from the qualifying round, only the results of the third-placed team against the winners and runners-up in each group are taken into account.

Tiebreakers
The following criteria are applied to determine the rankings.
 Higher number of points obtained in these matches
 Superior goal difference from these matches
 Higher number of goals scored in these matches
 Fair play conduct of the teams in all group matches in the qualifying round
 Drawing of lots

References

External links 
 UEFA website

Qualification
UEFA European Under-17 Championship qualification